Caner Topaloğlu (born April 17, 1985) is a Turkish former professional basketball player.

Career
On July 25, 2013, Topaloğlu signed a contract with the Turkish team Beşiktaş. After one season, he parted ways with Beşiktaş.

For the 2014–15 season he signed with İstanbul BB.

On June 26, 2015, he signed a three-year deal with Tofaş.

On January 24, 2018, he returned to his old club Galatasaray.

On January 25, 2019, he signed with İstanbul Büyükşehir Belediyespor.

On July 6, 2020, he has announced his retirement from professional basketball.

References

External links
TBLStat.net Profile

1985 births
Living people
Bandırma B.İ.K. players
Beşiktaş men's basketball players
Galatasaray S.K. (men's basketball) players
İstanbul Büyükşehir Belediyespor basketball players
Karşıyaka basketball players
Small forwards
Sportspeople from Trabzon
TED Ankara Kolejliler players
Tofaş S.K. players
Turkish men's basketball players
Ülker G.S.K. basketball players